Arbey Mosquera Mina (born 20 January 1988 in Buenaventura), is a Colombian professional footballer who currently plays for Naft Al-Wasat in Iraqi Premier League.

Honours
Cortuluá
Categoría Primera B: 2009

References

External links

 
 

1988 births
Living people
Colombian footballers
Association football forwards
Colombian expatriate footballers
Cortuluá footballers
Atlético Bucaramanga footballers
Yaracuyanos FC players
Békéscsaba 1912 Előre footballers
Academia Puerto Cabello players
Naft Al-Wasat SC players
Expatriate footballers in Venezuela
Expatriate footballers in Hungary
Expatriate footballers in Iraq
Colombian expatriate sportspeople in Venezuela
Colombian expatriate sportspeople in Hungary
Colombian expatriate sportspeople in Iraq
Colombian expatriate sportspeople in El Salvador
Expatriate footballers in El Salvador
People from Buenaventura, Valle del Cauca
Sportspeople from Valle del Cauca Department